Ernest Hawkins Field at Memorial Stadium is an athletic stadium located in Commerce, Texas.  It is primarily used for American football, and is the home field of the Texas A&M University–Commerce Lions football team, Texas A&M-Commerce Men's and Women's Track and Field, and the Commerce High School Tigers Football team of the Commerce Independent School District. Prior to 1996, the stadium was named "East Texas State Memorial Stadium, and until the end of the 2017 season, it was known as Texas A&M-Commerce Memorial Stadium." The stadium was built in honor of the 78 Texas A&M-Commerce alums and students who fought and died during World War II. The stadium was renamed Ernest Hawkins Field at Memorial Stadium was formally changed in November 2017 in honor of longtime Lion football coach Ernest Hawkins.

Stadium history
Memorial Stadium began as a project of the Ex-Students Association in the fall of 1945. The ESA and friends of the University raised a portion of the funds before the University itself received a state appropriation for the rest of the $300,000 to build the facility. Construction on the facility was started in the fall of 1949 and work continued quickly to have the stadium ready for the start of the 1950 season. The stadium was opened and dedicated on Sept. 23, 1950 with a game against regional rival the University of North Texas. The dedication ceremony featured U.S. Speaker of the House and Texas A&M Commerce alumnus Sam Rayburn and former Texas lieutenant governor Walter Woodul. General Douglas MacArthur, while not in attendance, wrote to then University President James Gee that "I am delighted and honored," to have his quotation affixed to the plaque honoring the Lions fallen comrades. That quote, also chiseled on the stadium at the U.S. Military Academy at West Point, is a famous one:

"Upon the fields of friendly strife, are sown the seeds that, Upon other fields, on other days, will bear the fruits of victory."

The Lions and Eagles played before a capacity crowd of 12,000 fans from all over North Texas that night as the Eagles came out on top 42–20. It has proven over the history of the Stadium to be one of the few home losses for Lion football, as they have won nearly 70 percent of the games they have played at home. In 1996, when the Texas A&M University System purchased East Texas State University, the name was changed from ETSU Memorial Stadium to Texas A&M University-Commerce Memorial Stadium.

Renovations and modifications
1973 – President's suite and box was added to the press box, along with 4 other rooms for viewing the game, making 5 suites in all. Aluminum bleachers were brought in to replace the concrete seating, and the T-Lounge was built for the Football program to house the dressing and training rooms for the team at the south end zone.
1978 – The athletic department and University officials decided to demolish the 2,000 visitor stands on the east side of the stadium and fill that space with tennis courts to be able to host the Lone Star Conference and NAIA national tennis tournaments. Also, fewer visitor fans were making the trip to Commerce due to the expanding distance between the conference schools. The result was reducing the capacity of the stadium to 10,000 fans.
1980 – An All-Weather rubberized surface track was installed, replacing the cinder surface.
1987 – A new ticket booth was placed at the main entrance of the stadium.
1999 – New stadium lighting fixtures were installed and the scoreboard updated with local sponsorships.
2006 – The natural grass surface was replaced with a FieldTurf artificial playing surface, a new digital messaging scoreboard was installed and replaced the previous scoreboard. The track was also repaved and the press box was decorated with a bold print message that reads HOME OF THE LIONS.
2010 – The east side stands were replaced with new seating technology that increased the capacity to 13,500. The new stadium also added an east side press box, new restrooms and concessions, a new dressing and locker room for the Lion Football program at the north end of the stadium and the T-Lounge was demolished. A Daktronics video jumbotron scoreboard was installed that at the time of completion the largest video board in all of NCAA Division II athletics.
2013 – The playing surface is replaced again, this time showing a large Lion head that stretches 50 yards long and 50 yards wide, making it possibly the largest on site logo in the entire world according to the Guinness Book of World Records. The west side is also renovated, adding nearly 500 reserved section seats for season ticket holders and also has various cosmetic improvements around the stadium.
2014 – The school athletic department creates a corporate sponsorship with Ben E. Keith and GoodSport and puts new signage on the outer facade of the stadium honoring the 1972 National Championship team, and individual murals for former Lions Bobby Bounds, Gary Compton, Ernest Hawkins, Tevin Moore, and Billy Watkins, honoring the records they hold for the school.

Notable games

 The first game was played in September 1950 against the University of North Texas.
 1966 against Texas A&M-Kingsville on a fourth and goal play Lion QB Ben Kirkland threw a pass at the back of the end zone that was caught by Tom Black, giving Head Coach Ernest Hawkins his first conference championship with a 21–20 win.
 1969-Vs. Stephen F. Austin State – Three years later on another miraculous closing seconds game winner, James Dietz lofted a perfect pass to George Daskalakes for a touchdown and again for a two-point conversion to beat the Lumberjacks, 36–35 and force SFA to share the conference title with the Lions.
 November 1972–The Lions defeat the number one ranked Central Oklahoma Bronchos 54–0 in the NAIA national semifinals to clinch a spot in the national championship game.
 December 1972 – In front of much of Northeast Texas, the Lions defeat Carson-Newman College, 21–18 for the 1972 NAIA Division I national football championship on a bitterly cold December afternoon.
 October 1977-Texas A&M-Kingsville's 46-game unbeaten streak ended Lion kicker Tom Hay split the uprights with an extra-point to defeat the Javelinas, 7–6.
 September 1991 – Another national streak ended on a humid September night as the Lions defeated the Pittsburg State Gorillas, 20–13. PSU came into Commerce riding a 56-game winning streak and would go on to win the Division II National Championship later that season.
 November 1991 – The Lions host their first NCAA playoff contest and defeat Grand Valley State University, 36–15.
 September 4, 2014 – the Lions opened the season with a record-breaking performance, defeating East Texas Baptist by a score of 98–20. During this game the offense produced 13 touchdowns, 98 points, and 986 total yards of offense. The win gained the Lions national exposure as it was reported on ESPN's Sportscenter that same night. The next day, head coach Colby Carthel was interviewed by ESPN's Linda Cohn in regards to the win. In that win the Lions set national and conference records for points scored, yards gained, and total offense in a game. On November 1, 2014, the Lions reached the 90 point mark for a second time during their homecoming game against McMurry. The Lions won by a score of 91–13 and clinched their first Lone Star Conference title under head coach Colby Carthel.

 During the 2015 season, the Lions hosted 2 nationally televised games at Memorial Stadium. The first of which was a hard-fought 38–35 victory over the Angelo State Rams that ended up being broadcast on ESPN. The second game was broadcast on American Sports Network, where the Lions fell in the Lone Star Conference playoff title game against the Midwestern State Mustangs by a score of 37–33.
 December 9, 2017, A new stadium record attendance of 10,120 was set as the Lions defeated Harding (Ark) 31–17 in an NCAA Division II semi-final game.

Other functions
In addition to football games for Texas A&M Commerce and Commerce High School, it also hosts college and high school track meets, including the Lone Star Conference's track and field championships, and the University Interscholastic League's Conference 4A Region II track meet, which is a precursor to the Texas High School State Track meet in Austin. It also hosts Texas High School football playoff games due to Commerce's proximity to the Dallas, Texas metro area and also to the far northwestern parts of East Texas.

Notable High School Games

Fall 2001-Commerce High School hosted the Forney Jackrabbits in a Class AAA district game in front of a standing room only crowd of over 10,000 fans. The Jackrabbits defeated the Tigers, but the Tigers would go on to win the Class AAA Division II State Championship.

See also
List of NCAA Division I FCS football stadiums

References

College football venues
Sports venues in Texas
American football venues in Texas
Texas A&M–Commerce Lions football